Undercover (Bulgarian: Под Прикритие, transcribed: Pod Prikritie, and pronounced:/pɔt pri'kritiɛ/) was a Bulgarian crime drama television series produced by Bulgarian National Television that premiered on BNT 1 on April 17, 2011.

Review

Episodes

Season 1 (2011)

Season 2 (2011–12)

Season 3 (2012–13)

Season 4 (2014)

Season 5 (2016)

External links
 Pod Prikritie Official website
 Pod Prikritie Facebook
 New Films International: Undercover
 

Bulgarian television series
2011 Bulgarian television series debuts
2010s Bulgarian television series
2016 Bulgarian television series endings